Split is a 1989 film directed by Chris Shaw and starring Timothy Dwight and Joan Bechtel. The film was notable for its early use of CGI. It was the final film appearance of Gene Evans.

Plot
A big brother-like leader from another dimension known as the Director controls our every move while letting us believe that we have free will. Starker is a homeless man for whom no records exist so he is able to elude the Director and his Agency. He attempts to counter the oppressive message and is forced to go into hiding with a round disc that he believes is the gateway to a greater humanity.

Cast
 Timothy Dwight as Starker
 Joan Bechtel as The waitress
 John Flynn as The artist
 Chris Shaw as The Director

Reception
Kevin Thomas of the Los Angeles Times called Split "a timeless political-religious parable".

References

External links 

1989 films
1989 science fiction films
1989 directorial debut films
Films about mass surveillance
1980s English-language films
American science fiction films
1980s American films